WITT (91.9 FM) is a non-commercial educational radio station licensed to serve Zionsville, Indiana, United States.  The station is owned by Kids First Incorporated. WITT airs a community radio format.

History
Almost nine years after their initial application was filed in September 1998, this station received its original construction permit from the Federal Communications Commission on May 30, 2007.  The new station was assigned the call letters WITT by the FCC on June 7, 2007. Regular broadcast operations began in June 2009.

WITT employs a unique format-less, format; in essence its programming is widely varied and ever changing. In addition, WITT encourages local listeners to produce shows for broadcast as well as airs programming from throughout the world.  WITT is non-commercial station which relies on listener financial support as well as donations by various corporations.  WITT has no paid-employees, as all work at the station is done on a volunteer basis. WITT is operated largely by its General Manager Jim Walsh and Chief Engineer Matt Masters.

See also
List of community radio stations in the United States

References

External links
WITT official website

ITT
Community radio stations in the United States
Boone County, Indiana